Ludwik Krasiński of Ślepowron (1609 in Ciechanów, Polish–Lithuanian Commonwealth – 1644) was a Polish royal courtier, the castellan of Ciechanów and, in 1637, the starosta of Płock.

He was the elector of Władysław IV of Płock Voivodeship in 1632. Ludwik was a member of parliament of Płock Voivodeship from its coronation in 1633 to 1637.

References

Ludwik
Secular senators of the Polish–Lithuanian Commonwealth
1609 births
1644 deaths